Boschmanskop No 1+2 Dam, is an earth-fill type dam on the Woes-Alleen River, near Middelburg, Mpumalanga, South Africa. It was established in 1995. Its primary purpose is flood control and it is owned by Optimum Colliery Pullen's Hope.

See also
List of reservoirs and dams in South Africa
List of rivers of South Africa

References 

 List of South African Dams from the Department of Water Affairs

Dams in South Africa
Dams completed in 1995